Wang Weizhong (born March 1962) is a Chinese politician, and current deputy party secretary and governor of Guangdong. A graduate of Tsinghua University, Wang rose through the ranks in the working for the Ministry of Science and Technology. He previously served as Party chief of Taiyuan.

Biography
Wang is a native of Shuozhou, Shanxi province. In September 1984, he graduated from the department of hydraulic engineering at Tsinghua University. In April 1987, he earned a master's degree. He spent much of the next decade working for the ministry overseeing water resources. In August 1991 he was transferred to the National Science Commission (the later Ministry of Science and Technology) to work on matters related to the environment. 

In August 1994, Wang entered the ecology division of the National Science Commission. In July 1998, he was made head of the China 21st Century Agenda Management Center and the head of the Life Science Technology Development Center. In March 2006, he was named head of the finance department at the Ministry of Science and Technology. In April 2010, he was promoted to Vice Minister of Science and Technology.

In September 2014, Wang was 'parachuted' into Shanxi to handle the clean-up of the political scene after many senior level politicians had been placed under investigation as part of the anti-corruption campaign under Xi Jinping.  He was first named secretary-general of the party organization and a member of the provincial party standing committee. 
 In October 2016, Wang was named party chief of Taiyuan, the provincial capital.

In April 2017, Wang was named a member of the Guangdong provincial standing committee and party chief of Shenzhen.

On December 14, 2018, Wang rose to become deputy party secretary of Guangdong. In December 2021, he became governor of Guangdong, replacing Ma Xingrui.

In October 2022, he became a member of the 20th Central Committee of the Communist Party of China.

References

1962 births
Tsinghua University alumni
Living people
People from Shuozhou
Alternate members of the 19th Central Committee of the Chinese Communist Party
Members of the 19th Central Committee of the Chinese Communist Party
People's Republic of China politicians from Shanxi
Chinese Communist Party politicians from Shanxi